Mervyn Connaughton is a hurler from County Roscommon, Ireland. He plays with the Roscommon county team. In 2007 he captained them to win the National Hurling League Div 3 title and later the Nicky Rackard Cup, he also later won a Nicky Rackard Cup All Star that year. He plays with his local Athleague club with whom he won Roscommon Senior Hurling Championship medals in 2003, 2006 and 2007.

References

Roscommon inter-county hurlers
Athleague hurlers
Living people
Year of birth missing (living people)